Dangerous Streets is a fighting game developed by Micromania and released by Flair Software for the Amiga, Amiga CD32, and MS-DOS in 1993. It was poorly received by critics. Dangerous Streets was bundled with the CD32 in The Dangerous Streets Pack.

Gameplay

Dangerous Streets offers two-player battles, single matches against the computer, and a tournament mode. The eight characters (Keo, Lola, Luisa, Macalosh, Ombra, Pinen, Sgiosa Capeli, Tony) can be controlled with either a joystick or a keyboard and have the ability to punch or kick in the range of weak, medium, and strong.

Reception
The game was derided by critics. Stuart Campbell of Amiga Power gave it a rating of 3%, describing it as the worst game for the CD32 and one of the worst games ever.

The Amiga CD32 version is included in Stuart Ashen's 2015 book Terrible Old Games You've Probably Never Heard Of, in which he remarks that Dangerous Streets looks "quite pretty" in screenshots, expressing that "characters are competently drawn and well-defined, and the backgrounds are colourful". He however expresses that this is no longer the case when the characters move, as Ashen calls Dangerous Streets'  animation "beyond laughable", and speculates that this was "a marketing strategy to make magazine reviews and the back of the box more impressive". Ashen criticises Dangerous Streets'  gameplay and controls, calling its fighting moves "an almost animation-free cavalcade of seemingly random, jerky attacks with no thought put into how they would affect the gameplay", and expresses that the controls "make no sense" and moving quickly is "a nightmare" due to the character's "bizarre" jump animations.

References

External links
 Dangerous Streets at Lemon Amiga
 Dangerous Streets at Amiga Hall of Light

1993 video games
Amiga games
Amiga CD32 games
DOS games
Fighting games
Video games developed in the United Kingdom
Flair Software games
Multiplayer and single-player video games